Maponics is a Pitney Bowes company headquartered in White River Junction, Vermont, United States that produces geographic boundary data that is used in mapping applications and other services that utilize location-based data.

History 

Maponics was founded in 2001 by Darrin Clement.  Maponics specializes in creating pre-defined geofences and other geographic boundaries that are meaningful to consumers.  Maponics' location data is used by many of the world's largest organizations, including Foursquare, Realtor.com, Trulia, ZipRealty, and Fannie Mae.

References

External links

Privately held companies based in Vermont
Software companies based in Vermont
Geomarketing research
2001 establishments in Vermont
American companies established in 2001
Defunct software companies of the United States

2001 establishments in the United States
Software companies established in 2001
Companies established in 2001